"French Kisses" is a song by English singer Jentina. It was released as the second single from her eponymous debut album Jentina (2005) and was only released in the UK and Ireland. It was written by Jentina, Cathy Dennis and Greg Wells.

A music video was made for this song, where Jentina is in a club trying to kiss a boy during the whole video, but something always occurs and they do not end up kissing. The video was directed by Dawn Shadforth.

Track listings
CD 1
"French Kisses"
"French Kisses" (E-Smoove Radio Edit)

CD 2
"French Kisses"
"French Kisses" (Switch's Jack the Box Remix)
"French Kisses" (Search & Destroy Remix)

12"
Side 1
"French Kisses"
"French Kisses" (E-Smoove Remix)
Side 2
"French Kisses" (Switch's Jack the Box Remix) {Side 2}

Chart performance

References

Songs about kissing
2004 singles
Jentina songs
Songs written by Cathy Dennis
Songs written by Greg Wells
Song recordings produced by Greg Wells
2004 songs
Virgin Records singles